Mississippi Township is one of eleven townships in Jersey County, Illinois, United States.  As of the 2010 census, its population was 2,041 and it contained 804 housing units.

Geography

Unincorporated towns
 Delhi
 Dow
 East Newbern
 McClusky
 New Delhi
 Newbern

Adjacent townships
 Jersey Township (north)
 Fidelity Township (northeast)
 Piasa Township (east)
 Godfrey Township, Madison County (southeast)
 Elsah Township (south)
 Otter Creek Township (west)
 English Township (northwest)

Cemeteries
The township contains these five cemeteries: Bethel, Lamb Memorial, Lurton, Newbern and Van Horn.

Major highways
  U.S. Route 67
  Illinois Route 3
  Illinois Route 109

Airports and landing strips
 William E Koenig Airport

Demographics

School districts
 Jersey Community Unit School District 100

Political districts
 Illinois' 19th congressional district
 State House District 97
 State Senate District 49

References
 
 United States Census Bureau 2007 TIGER/Line Shapefiles
 United States National Atlas

External links
 City-Data.com
 Illinois State Archives

Townships in Jersey County, Illinois
Townships in Illinois